Siga is a genus of moths of the family Crambidae described by Jacob Hübner in 1820.

Species
Siga liris (Cramer, 1775)
Siga pyronia Druce, 1895

References

Spilomelinae
Crambidae genera
Taxa named by Jacob Hübner